The Incorporated Television Company (ITC), or ITC Entertainment as it was referred to in the United States, was a British company involved in production and distribution of television programmes.

History

Incorporated Television Programme Company
Television mogul Lew Grade set up the Incorporated Television Programme Company (ITP) with Prince Littler and Val Parnell in 1954. Originally designed to be a contractor for the UK's new ITV network, the company failed to win a contract when the Independent Television Authority felt that doing so would give too much control in the entertainment business to the Grade family's companies (which included large talent agencies and theatre interests) although the ITA said that ITP were free to make their own programmes which they could sell to the new network companies. ITP put most of the production budget into producing one show, The Adventures of Robin Hood (ITV, 1955–59).

However, the winner of one of the contracts, the Associated Broadcasting Development Company, had insufficient funds to start broadcasting, so the ITP owners were brought into the consortium—now renamed the Associated Broadcasting Company (ABC)—and Lew Grade came to dominate it.

Incorporated Television Company
In 1957, now known as Incorporated Television Company (ITC), the company became a subsidiary of Associated Television (ATV)—the name ABC had adopted after threats of legal action from fellow ITV company Associated British Cinemas (Television) Ltd—and produced its own programmes for ATV and for syndication in the United States. It also distributed ATV material outside of the UK. From 1966 to 1982 it was a subsidiary of Associated Communications Corporation after the acquisition of ATV.

The initials 'ITC' stood for two different things: Independent Television Corporation for sales to the Americas, and Incorporated Television Company for sales to the rest of the world. The American Independent Television Corporation was formed in 1958 as a joint venture with Jack Wrather. In September 1958 it purchased Television Programs of America (TPA) for $11,350,000. Wrather sold his shares to Lew Grade at the end of the decade.

The large foreign sales achieved by ITC during the British government's export drives of the 1960s and 1970s led to ACC receiving the Queen's Award for Export on numerous occasions.

On 18 August 1986, ITC Entertainment announced that they would relocate its headquarters from London to New York City, in order to follow the company restructuring of the studio.

In 1986, ITC Entertainment and Kings Road Entertainment entered into an agreement whereas they would handle United States and Canadian distribution of all-new theatrical films that were produced by the Kings Road studio, for a multi-million dollar agreement. In 1987, ITC and HBO signed an exclusive agreement whereas ITC to handle exclusive domestic television distribution rights to the eight motion pictures produced by HBO. That year, HBO and ITC would receive a 12-picture agreement for pay cable films that was licensed for foreign release, namely theatrical release, and the parties are worth up to $55 million and that the production budgets for the 12-picture HBO/ITC joint agreement would be $4.5 million, which is standard for pictures for cable exposure. It also included an agreement for home video release whereas HBO would gave them home video and pay cable rights in the U.S. and ITC handling all foreign and free TV rights to its films, whereas HBO would gave them eight pictures and ITC would got four pictures.

During 1988 The Bell Group, the owners of ITC were taken over by the Bond Corporation. Subsequently, the new owners started an asset-stripping programme. In November 1988 ITC Entertainment was bought by its management. In 1990, ITC abandoned television production and concentrated on low-budget feature films. TV production at ITC would not resume until the company forged a deal with producer David Gerber in 1993. In the meantime, it entered into a financing agreement with Interscope Communications to handle U.S. and foreign sales of its telemovies.

In 1989, ITC Home Video was formed in the United Kingdom, to make use of the many hours of programmes in the archive, then unseen for years. This short-lived home entertainment division would end in 1991. In the following period, ITC continued to distribute its past library. In 1988, it inked a deal with J2 Communications to distribute video titles for the United States television market.

In 1995, PolyGram purchased the company for $156 million. with Grade once again returning to ITC to act as a consultant until his death in December 1998. In 1997, it was absorbed into PolyGram Television.

On 10 December 1998, Universal Studios' parent, Seagram purchased PolyGram for $10.2 billion. In early January 1999, Carlton Communications bought the ITC television and film library from PolyGram/Seagram for £91 million, which reunited the programme library of ATV and Central Television and doubled the stock of its library division Carlton International, by giving it a total of 15,000 hours of programming.  Carlton chairman Michael Green said: 'The ITC library is a jewel in the crown. We can now unite it with the other gems from Britain's film and television heritage in our excellent library.' In 2004, Carlton merged with Granada plc to form ITV plc. ITV Studios continues to release ITC's original output through television and Internet-streaming repeats, books and DVD and Blu-ray releases.

In 2005, to commemorate the 50th anniversary of the founding of the company, Network released a DVD box set entitled ITC 50 featuring episodes from eighteen different ITC productions.

Productions

Reputation
ITC is best known for being the company behind many successful British cult TV filmed series during the 1960s and 1970s, such as The Saint, Randall and Hopkirk (Deceased), Danger Man, The Baron, Gideon's Way, The Champions, The Prisoner, Thunderbirds, Captain Scarlet and the Mysterons, Stingray, Joe 90,  Man in a Suitcase, Strange Report, Department S, The Persuaders!, Jason King, The Adventurer, The Protectors, Space 1999, and Return of the Saint. It was also the production company for The Muppet Show and Julie on Sesame Street which were both made at the ATV Elstree Studios and distributed in the UK by ATV and in the US by ITC.

Entry into production
ITC got its start as a production company when former American producer Hannah Weinstein approached Lew Grade. Weinstein wanted to make a programme called The Adventures of Robin Hood. Weinstein proposed making the series for ITV and simultaneously marketing it in the United States through an American TV distribution company, Official Films. The series was a big success in both countries, running from 1955 until 1959 on CBS and ATV London.

"Ground-breakages"
Grade realised the potential in overseas sales and colour television (the last 14 episodes of The Adventures of Sir Lancelot were filmed in colour a decade before colour television existed in the UK), and ITC combined high production values with exotic locations and uses of variations on the same successful formula for the majority of its television output.

ITC United States programmes
Although most of the ITC series were produced in Britain, ITC often worked with Television Programs of America (TPA) and several series were filmed in America. Possibly the earliest ITC series produced in the US was Fury, a Saturday morning live-action series, about a beloved ranch horse, which starred Peter Graves and ran on NBC in the late 1950s and early 1960s.

In 1963 Gerry Anderson's Anderson-Provis (AP) Films became part of ACC and produced Fireball XL-5, the hugely successful children's series Thunderbirds and, under its successor company Century 21 Television/Cinema Productions, Captain Scarlet and the Mysterons. ITC also funded Anderson-created programmes aimed at the adult market, including UFO and Space: 1999. It was at ITC's request that Fanderson, "the Gerry Anderson Appreciation Society," was founded. Another ITC children's series was The Adventures of Rupert Bear, the first television outing for the Daily Express cartoon character. ITC (in partnership with the Italian company RAI) was also behind Franco Zeffirelli's Biblical mini-series Jesus of Nazareth, Moses the Lawgiver, and the Gregory Peck television film The Scarlet and the Black.

In 1978, ITC launched a subsidiary Marble Arch Productions for American-produced programmes, which subsequently in 1982, was renamed to ITC Productions. Through Marble Arch, it only gave them two sitcoms, Maggie, which ABC aired from 1981 to 1982 and The Two of Us, which aired on CBS, also that same season. On 20 August 1986, ITC Productions had branched out into the series arena, and decided to expand to first-run syndication and pay cable markets. In 1987, on the heels of the HBO pact, ITC Productions decided to expand a trio of feature films and added to its growing larder of network telefilms and miniseries on which ITC has traditionally concerned in the past few years. In 1990, ITC began placing Marble Arch up for sale amid financial losses. That year, Marble Arch's duties were assumed by Interscope Communications, a film and television production company. The company hasn't made productions until 1993 with a deal with producer David Gerber.

Films and sundry programmes
In addition to television programming, ITC also produced several films. In 1976, the company teamed up with General Cinema Corporation to form Associated General Films, and produced films including Voyage of the Damned, Capricorn One, and The Eagle Has Landed but the partnership ended the following year.

Other films produced by ITC include The Boys from Brazil, The Return of the Pink Panther, The Last Unicorn, and a number of Jim Henson Company productions: The Dark Crystal and the first two Muppet films, The Muppet Movie and The Great Muppet Caper. Initially, ITC productions were licensed out to other US studios for release until 1979, when ITC partnered with another UK-based production company, Thorn EMI Screen Entertainment, to create Associated Film Distribution, which would release films produced by each company, as well as pick-ups from other production companies. In 1979, the subsidiary Black Lion Films was founded in the manner of Thames Euston Films, but its best remembered production, The Long Good Friday, was sold on to HandMade Films.

The 1980s
In the summer of 1980, two films released by AFD within six weeks of each other helped lead to the distribution company's dissolution. Can't Stop the Music, designed to be a showcase for Village People at the height of disco music, was released 20 June 1980, by which time disco's popularity had diminished and the form was experiencing a backlash from music listeners. The poorly reviewed film ultimately grossed $2 million on a $20 million budget. On 1 August 1980, the release of the poorly received Raise the Titanic! met with pre-release criticism from the novel's author, Clive Cussler, and recouped only a fraction of its costs; Grade himself retired from active film production, commenting that it would have been cheaper to "lower the Atlantic." Cussler himself told People Weekly Magazine, "The film was so poor, it boggles the mind."

After the films' failures, ITC and EMI agreed to sell AFD and the distribution rights to its library to Universal Pictures, though the AFD films which were then in post production at the time were still ultimately released by AFD, to handle the release of the remaining pictures still in production at the time of the sale, beginning with The Legend of the Lone Ranger, and including On Golden Pond, Sophie's Choice, The Dark Crystal, and The Great Muppet Caper. As January 2016 was beginning, while the various copyrights had reverted to their respective owners, Universal still maintained theatrical rights to most of the ITC and EMI films initially released by AFD. While in the UK ITC entered into a agreement with Lorimar for UK theatrical distribution of Lorimar's feature films

In 1983, ITC produced and released the animated series Thunderbirds 2086, which was not an original British series based on the Gerry Anderson Thunderbirds. It was actually an English dubbed version of Scientific Rescue Team Technoboyager, a Japanese anime that has an identical premise to Anderson's Thunderbirds. ITC licensed the series for an English dub and re-imagined the series as set twenty years after the original, thus being an evolution of that same International Rescue Organization. However, the Tracy family and associated characters from the Gerry Anderson Thunderbirds are never mentioned.

The 1990s
In 1990, ITC briefly attempted to enter the lucrative American game show market, with a syndicated revival of Tic-Tac-Dough, which had previously run from 1978 to 1986 in syndication, alongside Barry & Enright Productions. However, the show was off the air by March 1991, mainly due to a glut of syndicated game show offerings during the 1990–91 season, as well as several changes in gameplay which were criticised, as was host Patrick Wayne.

Grade himself died in 1998.

Current rights ownership
Today, the underlying rights are generally owned by ITV Studios Global Entertainment via ITV plc and its respective predecessors, although in most cases Shout! Factory now holds full worldwide distribution rights (with US theatrical distribution handled by Shout!’s Westchester Films division, passed on from former distributors Metro-Goldwyn-Mayer and Park Circus). In turn, Shout!’s video distribution rights in North America to a majority of the ITC Entertainment library were assumed from Lionsgate Home Entertainment.

As for ITC's television output, Carlton (and later Granada and now ITV) released some of these shows on DVD both in Europe and North America. There were however a few exceptions: The Adventures of Robin Hood and the other swashbuckling adventure series of the late 1950s and early 1960s were released on DVD by Network, as was Strange Report.

Many of the drama shows from the 1960s and 1970s have since been released by Network as limited edition box sets.

The Walt Disney Company has owned the Muppets franchise since 2004, including ITC productions The Muppet Show, The Muppet Movie, and The Great Muppet Caper. The Jim Henson Company owns the ITC production The Dark Crystal as it had bought the film from the company after production had completed. While Universal Pictures retains both domestic and international theatrical rights to the film, its home video rights are licensed to Sony Pictures Entertainment, while its television broadcast rights are licensed to Sony Pictures Television.

List of ITC Entertainment productions and distributions
ITC produced and distributed a wide range of content across both film and television, over several decades. ITC productions and distributions crossed many different genres – from historical adventure, to spy-fi and action, and later into both children's and adult science-fiction – as well as films covering many different subjects.

The ITC Distributions page offers a complete list of ITC produced and distributed programmes.

Filmography

Studios
ITC had no studios of its own. Programmes were made in several facilities but most notably at ABPC's Elstree film studios (not to be confused with ATV's nearby Clarendon Road Studios, Borehamwood, which was a live/videotape facility, and now known as BBC Elstree). However, the MGM-British Studios complex at Borehamwood, the Rank Organisation's Pinewood and Shepperton Studios were also used.
'Ghost Squad' was made at the Independent Artists Studio in Beaconsfield.

Associated Communications Corporation companies
 APF
 ATV Network
 Central Independent Television
 ITC Films
 Independent Television Corporation
 Incorporated Television Company
Marble Arch Productions

See also
 AP Films
 Century 21 Productions
 Cult television
 Gerry Anderson
 ITV (TV channel)
 Sapphire Films

References

 
Carlton Television
Universal Pictures
Mass media companies disestablished in 1998
Film distributors of the United Kingdom
The Muppets
Television syndication distributors
Film production companies of the United Kingdom
Television production companies of the United Kingdom
1998 disestablishments in the United Kingdom
1954 establishments in the United Kingdom
Mass media companies established in 1954
1957 mergers and acquisitions
1966 mergers and acquisitions
1982 mergers and acquisitions
1988 mergers and acquisitions
1995 mergers and acquisitions